The Howard Yard is a CTA rail yard in the Rogers Park neighborhood on the North Side of Chicago, Illinois which stores cars from the Yellow, Red, and Purple Lines of the Chicago Transit Authority. Currently, 5000-series railcars are stored here. It is adjacent to Howard station.

References

Chicago Transit Authority